The FG 1250 or Fahr- und Zielgerät FG 1250 (driving and aiming device FG 1250) was a German active infrared night-vision device mounted on tanks and other armored vehicles. It was developed by Ing Gaertner of the German optics company Carl Zeiss AG beginning in 1941.

It consisted of a specialized mount, active infrared spotlight and accompanying image converter. In the later stages of World War II the bulky FG 1250 active infrared unit was paired to some MG 42 and MG 34 machine guns on Sd.Kfz. 251/1 Falke half-track armored personnel carriers.

References

World War II weapons of Germany